The following is a list of the speakers of the Nebraska Legislature since it became unicameral in 1937.

External links
Nebraska Blue Book
specifically (in the 2012-13 Blue Book), page 403, "Presiding Officers of the Nebraska Legislature, 1855–2013"

Nebraska Legislature
Speakers
Nebraska
Nebraska